The siege of Varna took place between 21 and 24 March 1201 at Varna, on the Bulgarian Black Sea coast between the Bulgarians and the Byzantines. The Bulgarians were victorious and captured the city.

Prelude 
After the youngest of the three Asen brothers, Kaloyan, was crowned Emperor in early 1197 he immediately showed his resolution to continue the war with the Byzantines by all means and liberate all Bulgarian lands. In the next year Kaloyan even allied with Ivanko, the murderer of his eldest brother, Ivan Asen.

The siege 
At the turn of the new century he seized the strong castle of Constancia (near modern Simeonovgrad) and then struck in the opposite direction and besieged the last Byzantine stronghold to the north of the Balkan mountains, Varna. Varna was defended by a large garrison including western mercenaries who were known to be the bravest soldiers in the Byzantine army. To take the fortress the Bulgarian engineers constructed an enormous siege tower which was wider that the outer moat. With the help of the siege equipment the Bulgarian army was able to cross the moat and reach the walls of the city and on the third day of the siege, on 24 March 1201 the Bulgarians made a breakthrough. According to the Byzantine historian Niketas Choniates Kaloyan did not hesitate to kill all defenders despite the fact that it was Easter. The Byzantines were thrown in the moat and buried alive. This action, carried out according to George Acropolites as revenge for the 14 thousand blinded Bulgarian prisoners of war by Emperor Basil II "the Bulgar Slayer" after the Battle of Klyuch in 1014,when the Bulgarian tsar Samuil was defeated,  earned Kaloyan the moniker "the Roman Slayer". After that he destroyed the city walls and returned to the capital Tarnovo.

Aftermath 
By the end of the year Bulgaria and Byzantium started negotiation which ended with a peace treaty in the beginning of 1202. The Bulgarians secured their new gains and now were able to face the Hungarian threat to the north-west. After several battle in the valley of the Morava river, the Hungarians were defeated.

References

Further reading 
Атанас Пейчев и колектив, 1300 години на стража, Военно издателство, София 1984.
Йордан Андреев, Милчо Лалков, Българските ханове и царе, Велико Търново, 1996.
 Alexandru MADGEARU, Siege Techniques Applied by the Army of Johannitsa the Emperor of Romanians and Bulgarians, between 1201 and 1207 in Relații Interetnice în Transilvania Militaria Mediaevalia în Europa centrală și de sud-est, Editura ASTRA MUSEUM, Sibiu, 2018

History of Varna, Bulgaria
1201 in Europe
1200s in the Byzantine Empire
13th century in Bulgaria
Sieges involving the Second Bulgarian Empire
Battles of the Byzantine–Bulgarian Wars
Conflicts in 1201